Petalodus is an extinct genus of cartilaginous fish from the Pennsylvanian to the Permian, known from subtriangular to rhomboidal teeth. The genus was named by Richard Owen in 1840 and the type species is Petalodus hastingsii. The only dubious species within this genus is P. securiger.

Sources 

Petalodontiformes
Carboniferous fish of Asia
Permian fish of Asia
Paleozoic fish of Europe
Fossil taxa described in 1840